VRU is an abbreviation of:

Vapor recovery unit, a means for recycling evaporated fuel.
Vancouver Rugby Union in Canada.
Victorian Rugby Union in Australia.
Verkhovna Rada of Ukraine, its parliament. 
 Vertical reference unit, used for dynamic positioning.
 Violence Reduction Unit, a division of the Scottish police force.
 Voice response unit, a telephony system also known as interactive voice response.
Vulnerable road user, a concept in road traffic safety.